Ilyas Zhansugurov (Ilias Jansügırov; 1 May 1894 — 26 February 1938) was a Kazakh poet and writer. He made a significant contribution to the development of national poetic culture, creatively developed the traditions of Kazakh oral folk art. The town of Zhansugirov in Almaty Province is named after him and he is commemorated in Taldykorgan and Almaty.

A friend of another classic writer Mukhtar Auezov, Zhansugurov was the First President of the Writers' Union of Kazakhstan from 1934 to 1936. He wrote the novel Comrades (1933), targeted against the Soviet power, but also wrote loving poems such as The Steppe (1930) and Kulager (1936). He was repressed in 1937, as his writing was seen as a fuel for Kazakh nationalism, and shot on 26 February 1938.

The I. Zhansugurov Literary Museum is a center dedicated to the study of his work.

References

Kazakhstani poets
Soviet poets
Male poets
Soviet male writers
20th-century male writers
1894 births
1938 deaths
Great Purge victims from Kazakhstan
Deaths by firearm in Kazakhstan
Executed Kazakhstani people